The Japan national American football team represents Japan in international American football competitions. The team is controlled by the Japan American Football Association, and has been one of the world's strongest international teams since it began participating regularly in international tournaments in the 1990s, and currently possesses the second most American Football World Cups  (1999, 2003).

Japan won the inaugural 1999 IFAF World Championship and won again in 2003. In 2007 they advanced to the final, losing to the United States 23–20 in overtime. In 2010 Japan beat Germany 24–14 in the inaugural Germany-Japan Bowl. In February 2011, Japan bested South Korea (76–0) to qualify for the 2011 IFAF World Championship.

IFAF World Championship record

2011 IFAF World Championship Roster

2014
Preparing for the qualification match for the 2015 IFAF World Championship, the JAFA scheduled an international friendly match against Germany  on April 12, 2014 at Kawasaki Stadium in Kawasaki, Kanagawa. 85 players were initially chosen for the national team on March 11 which was whittled down to the required 45-men roster before April 12. Before a crowd of 1,889, Japan defeated Germany 38–0 in a strong defensive showing for the Japanese which limited Germany to only 135 yards of total offense, as well as causing four turnovers and two sacks, the latter of which was all in the second half. Before going against the Philippines, Japan made 5 changes in their roster, replacing WRs Ryoma Hagiyama and Naoki Maeda with Takeshi Akiyama and Junpei Yoshimoto, RB Keita Takanohashi with Takashi Miyako, LB Yuki Ikeda with Yoshiki Tanaka, and S Toshinari Masatani with Takeshi Miyake. Against a  young Philippine team that was in its first year in the IFAF, the Japanese showed no quarter, scoring on every offensive possession as well as holding the Philippines to only 1st down en route to an 86–0 victory, the 2nd biggest win in the national team's history. 
With the win, Japan, along with South Korea, (which defeated Kuwait in the other qualification match 69-7) qualified for the 2015 IFAF World Championship tournament in Canton, Ohio, United States.

2015

Due to Canada dropping out of the tournament for personal team reasons, Japan was granted a bye on the scheduled match which was supposed to be on July 9 and in turn would play the winner of the Mexico-United States match on July 12. In their first match of the tournament, Japan, despite a strong defensive showing in the first half that included 2 interceptions and 29-yd field goal block, eventually lost to the United States 18–43. In their 2nd match, Japan defeated Mexico 35–7 with a strong effort on offense and defense. The win ensured the Japanese a rematch with the United States for the Gold Medal. Team Japan would lose to the United States 12–59 in what is the national team's largest loss in history.

See also
Eyeshield 21
X-League

Notes

External links
  Japan American football national team Official website

American football in Japan
Men's national American football teams
American football
1984 establishments in Japan
American football teams established in 1984